Jerry O'Neil Lawler (born November 29, 1949), better known as Jerry "The King" Lawler, is an American color commentator and professional wrestler. He is currently signed to WWE, although he has not performed as a full-time commentator since April 2020.

Prior to joining the World Wrestling Federation (WWF, now WWE) in 1992, he wrestled in numerous territories, winning many championships, including multiple World Heavyweight Championships, throughout his career. Lawler is a one-time AWA World Heavyweight Champion and a three-time WCWA World Heavyweight Champion: he unified the titles by defeating Kerry Von Erich at Superclash III, forming the USWA Unified World Heavyweight Championship, a championship which he held 28 times. He is also known for his feud with comedian Andy Kaufman and he portrayed himself in the 1999 film Man on the Moon.

Lawler has held more recognized championships than any professional wrestler in history though he has never won any championships in WWE having wrestled sporadically whilst primarily providing color commentary, since joining the company. In 2007, Lawler was inducted into the WWE Hall of Fame.

Early life
Lawler was born November 29, 1949, in Memphis, Tennessee, where he graduated from Treadwell High School. When he was 19, his father, Jerome Lawler, died.

Professional wrestling career

Early career (1970–1977)
While working in Memphis, Tennessee, as a disc jockey, Lawler's artistic ability attracted the attention of local wrestling promoter Aubrey Griffith.

The two made an agreement in which Lawler would give Griffith free publicity in exchange for free wrestling training. Lawler debuted as a wrestler in 1970, and won his first championship in September 1971 by winning a battle royal. He soon won the NWA Southern Tag Team Championship under the managerial service of Sam Bass with partner Jim White. In 1974, Lawler began feuding with Jackie Fargo, who had been his trainer and mentor. This led to a match for the NWA Southern Heavyweight Championship. On July 24, 1974, Lawler won the belt and the title of "King of Wrestling."

During 1975, Lawler teamed with a variety of partners such as Mr Wrestling II, Don Greene, and Bob Orton, Jr. He won the NWA Macon Tag Team Championship twice during this period. While Lawler began his career as a heel, he became a face after splitting from Bass at the end of 1974.

Continental Wrestling Association (1977–1989)

In 1977, promoter Jerry Jarrett broke away from Nick Gulas' NWA Mid-America promotion and formed his own promotion, the Continental Wrestling Association. Lawler—Gulas' biggest star—opted to join Jarrett. The CWA quickly outperformed NWA Mid-America, which ultimately folded in 1981. Lawler was both a co-owner of the CWA and its top star.

On November 12, 1979, while working in the CWA, Lawler defeated Superstar Billy Graham to become the CWA World Champion. In 1980, coming off the back end of a feud with The Fabulous Freebirds, his career was put on hold due to a broken leg suffered in a game of touch football, but he returned to the ring after several months.

In 1982, Lawler began a notorious feud with comedian Andy Kaufman. At the time, Kaufman wrestled women as part of his skits and had declared himself the Intergender Heavyweight Champion. On April 5, Lawler, who had taken exception to the skits, wrestled Kaufman in Memphis. During the course of the match, Lawler delivered two piledrivers to Kaufman, the second after the bell rang, sending him to the hospital and nearly breaking his neck. On July 29, Lawler slapped Kaufman in the face on an episode of Late Night with David Letterman. Kaufman responded by shouting profanities and throwing his coffee at Lawler.

Years later, Lawler appeared as himself in the Kaufman biopic Man on the Moon; the film revealed that Lawler's feud with Kaufman had been staged. Lawler later claimed that not only was his entire feud with Kaufman staged, but also the two were actually very good friends.

In 1988, Lawler feuded with Dutch Mantel.

In 1989, the CWA merged with World Class Championship Wrestling to form the United States Wrestling Association.

American Wrestling Association (1982–1985, 1987–1988)
On March 7, 1983, Lawler won the AWA International Championship by defeating Austin Idol. On May 30, 1983, Bill Dundee defeated Jerry Lawler for the AWA Southern Heavyweight Championship. The feud quickly escalated and on June 6, 1983, the two met in a Loser Leaves Town Match for the title, in which Lawler won. Lawler defeated Ken Patera on July 25 to begin his second reign as the International Champion. Lawler became the NWA Mid America Champion on April 12, 1984, when he defeated Randy Savage for the title. He later returned to the United States, where he defeated Bill Dundee on July 29, 1986, to begin a new reign as the AWA International Champion. Lawler feuded with Tommy Rich, Austin Idol, and Paul E. Dangerously throughout early 1987. The animosity began after controversy over an AWA World Championship title shot involving Nick Bockwinkel. During the feud, the trio defeated Lawler in a steel cage match and cut his hair, which caused a riot in the Mid-South Coliseum.

Lawler won the AWA World Heavyweight Championship from Curt Hennig on May 9, 1988. During his reign, Lawler feuded with World Class Championship Wrestling's Champion Kerry Von Erich. He defeated Von Erich on December 15, 1988, at Superclash III to unify the two titles. Soon after, Lawler's issues with Verne Gagne led to his departure from the AWA, most notably Lawler claiming that he was never paid for the match at Superclash.

World Class Championship Wrestling (1988–1989)
Lawler continued feuding with Kerry Von Erich in WCCW. He lost to Von Erich in a steel cage match on November 25, 1988. He would defeat Von Erich by disqualification to retain the WCCW heavyweight title. He wrestled Mil Mascaras to a draw on July 28.

Other promotions (1981–1989)
In 1981, Lawler wrestled for Championship Wrestling From Florida feuding with Dory Funk Jr. and Terry Funk. In 1985, Lawler traveled to Hawaii, where he won the NWA Polynesian Pacific title on January 25, 1986, defeating Lars Anderson. He dropped the title to Tui Selinga on March 26 in Honolulu, Hawaii.

In March 1989, he wrestled for New Japan Pro-Wrestling. He lost to IWGP Heavyweight Champion Tatsumi Fujinami on March 16, 1989.

United States Wrestling Association (1989–1997)
In 1989, Lawler made his debut in the Memphis brand United States Wrestling Association, where he won the USWA Unified World Heavyweight Championship 28 times from 1989 until its doors closed in 1997. While champion, he feuded with The Soultaker, Jimmy Valiant, Kamala, Eddie Gilbert, and Jeff Jarrett.

In 1992, Lawler teamed with Jeff Jarrett in a feud against The Moondogs. The feud between Jarrett/Lawler and The Moondogs was voted the 1992 PWI Feud of the Year by Pro Wrestling Illustrated. He won the USWA World Tag Team Championship with Jarrett four times and twice with Bill Dundee.

Lawler dropped the USWA Unified World Heavyweight for the last time to Dutch Mantel on August 8, 1997 in an All Body Hair match. The promotion closed in November 1997.

World Wrestling Federation (1992–2001)

Feuds with Bret Hart and Doink the Clown (1992–1995)
Lawler began his WWF career in December 1992 as an announcer on Superstars. USWA began a working relationship with the WWF. He made his in-ring debut at the 1993 Royal Rumble when he participated in the namesake match, which was won by Yokozuna. From 1993 to 1995, he feuded with Bret Hart and the rest of the Hart family. The feud began at King of the Ring when Lawler interrupted Hart's victory ceremony and attacked Bret.

Lawler claimed that he was the only true king in the World Wrestling Federation (WWF), and the two were scheduled to wrestle at SummerSlam to settle the dispute. At the event, however, Lawler came to the ring on crutches and claimed that he could not wrestle because of injuries suffered in a car accident. Hart faced Lawler's "court jester", Doink the Clown instead, and beat him by submission. Lawler then attacked Hart, revealing that he was not injured. Hart defeated Lawler by submission but refused to release the Sharpshooter. As a result, the referee reversed the decision and awarded the title of "Undisputed King of the World Wrestling Federation" to Lawler. The two would continue to work throughout the fall on the house show circuit, including in steel cages.

Simultaneously, in a form of cross-promotion, Lawler engaged in a bitter feud with Vince McMahon (who at the time was never advertised as the actual owner of the World Wrestling Federation) back in the USWA. There, Lawler played the babyface to his hometown Memphis audience, whereas McMahon (who had always played face in the WWF) was being portrayed as a smug heel intent on dethroning Lawler as the king of professional wrestling. As part of the cross-promotion, McMahon, Bret and Owen Hart, Giant González, Tatanka, and "Macho Man" Randy Savage would begin appearing on USWA television to further the feud. While the program continued in the USWA, the feud between Lawler and McMahon would not be acknowledged on WWF television.

The Hart family (Bret, Owen, Bruce, and Keith) was scheduled to face a team captained by Lawler in an elimination match at Survivor Series. However, Shawn Michaels had to take Lawler's place because Lawler was facing legal troubles. He was indicted for raping and sodomizing a 15-year-old girl, though charges were dropped when the alleged victim recanted her story.

As a result, the feud between Lawler and Vince McMahon back in the USWA was also abruptly discontinued. Lawler did not face Bret Hart at another pay-per-view until the first In Your House, when he beat Hart after Hakushi and his manager Shinja interfered. This set up a "Kiss My Foot" match at King of the Ring 1995, which Bret won. As a result, Lawler was forced to kiss Bret's feet. The feud took one final turn when Lawler introduced his "dentist" Isaac Yankem, D.D.S.. After Hart defeated Yankem by disqualification, however, the feud quickly disappeared.

Following the end of his legal troubles which kept him out of Survivor Series 1993, Lawler eventually returned to the WWF at WrestleMania X, which was also his first appearance as a commentator on a WWF pay-per-view. During the main event of the night, "Rowdy" Roddy Piper served as special guest referee for the second WWF World Heavyweight Championship match. During this Lawler began making disparaging remarks about him. Lawler would continue to berate Piper on later episodes of Monday Night Raw, including bringing a skinny kid into the ring dressed as Piper and forcing him to kiss his feet. This ultimately led to a match between the two at King of the Ring 1994 which Lawler lost.

In the fall of 1994, Lawler initiated a feud with Doink the Clown. Lawler popped the balloons carried by Doink's midget sidekick, Dink. After Doink and Dink retaliated, Lawler introduced a midget sidekick of his own, who he named Queasy. In the following weeks, Doink added two more sidekicks, Wink and Pink, while Lawler introduced Sleazy and Cheesy. This led to an elimination match at Survivor Series 1994, which Lawler's team won. After the match, however, Lawler's team turned on him, joining with Doink's team to attack Lawler.

Smoky Mountain and various feuds (1994–1996)

In late 1994 and early 1995, Lawler wrestled briefly in Smoky Mountain Wrestling (SMW) while still continuing to commentate sporadically for the WWF. During his absences, Shawn Michaels filled in for him as color commentator on Monday Night Raw. He defeated Tony Anthony for the promotion's top title in January 1995. Lawler was the last SMW Heavyweight Champions defeating Brad Armstrong on Boxing Day 1995. The promotion closed its doors on December 30.

By 1996, Lawler wrestled occasionally on WWF Superstars where he would take on jobbers while holding a microphone in the ring to, essentially, "do the commentary on (his) very own matches" while occasionally serving as the official cornerman for Isaac Yankem D.D.S. After a brief feud with The Ultimate Warrior, Lawler began feuding with Jake Roberts after making fun of Roberts' real life drug and alcohol problems. The two met in a match at SummerSlam 1996, which Lawler won. After the match, Lawler poured Jim Beam whiskey down Roberts' throat.

Afterwards, he feuded with Mark Henry, which the two meet at In Your House 10: Mind Games which Henry won.

Part-time wrestling and commentator (1997–1998)
In early 1997, Lawler was involved in a working relationship between the WWF and Extreme Championship Wrestling (ECW). In June, Lawler entered the King of the Ring tournament for the first time and advanced to the semi-final round where he was defeated by Mankind. By the fall, the WWF introduced a new "light-heavyweight division" to compete with World Championship Wrestling (WCW)'s cruiserweight division. Lawler's son, Brian Christopher, was one of the major superstars in the division, although the WWF played up an angle where both Lawler and Christopher would deny their family relationship, even though the two would aide each other in matches and so on. USWA folded in November of that year.

By 1998, Lawler rarely wrestled in the WWF and focused on commentary. Despite their feud in the USWA in 1993, by 1998, Vince McMahon had turned heel in the WWF for the first time and left the announce position, to which Lawler began praising McMahon's name on commentary as part of his own heel persona, much to the chagrin of Jim Ross. It was McMahon's departure from the commentary team which led to the strong on-screen chemistry between Lawler and Ross in subsequent years. This played a key role in a change of Lawler's character; although he still supported the heels, he showed a sense of right and wrong, and would condemn actions of heels when they went too far.

Sporadic appearances, feud with Tazz, and departure (1999–2001)
Lawler during this period would continue commentating and rarely wrestled for WWF. He wrestled between 1999 and 2001 mainly in house shows. On June 22; 2000, he made an appearance on SmackDown! teaming with The Kat to defeat Dean Malenko and Terri Runnels. This would be the first time in two years he wrestled on WWF television. A week later, he defeated Malenko on Raw.

He would turn face by 2000 (while wrestling). This began when Lawler surprisingly attacked Tazz when the latter started bullying Jim Ross. At SummerSlam, The King wrestled Tazz in defense of Ross. Lawler won the match. A feud with Tazz begun. At Unforgiven, he lost to Tazz in a Leather Strap match. Also, Lawler feuded with Tazz's partner Raven until January 2001.

With the creation of the XFL in 2001, Lawler was given the job as an announcer for the new football league. Lawler claims that he never wanted to announce for the XFL (he would admit on-air that he knew and cared almost nothing about the sport), but that he agreed to it after McMahon and Kevin Dunn asked him.

In February 2001, Lawler's then-wife Stacy "The Kat" Carter was involved in a storyline where Right to Censor (RTC), a group of wrestlers purportedly wanting to rein in the vulgarity of the "Attitude Era," during which she demanded equal time for the "right for nudity". RTC's leader Steven Richards offered a match with Lawler at No Way Out. If Lawler won, Kat got naked and if Richards won, Kat became RTC property. Richards won the match at No Way Out. The next night, Lawler teamed with the APA (Bradshaw and Faarooq) as they defeated Right to Censor members Bull Buchanan, The Goodfather and Val Venis on Raw. This would be Lawler's last WWF match.

After No Way Out, The Kat was released by the WWF and Lawler quit the company in protest.

Lawler has stated several theories as to why he was allowed to leave. His first involves the ascent of Carter's career alongside the downfall of Chyna's. In his contention, Chyna was jealous of his wife's push inside the company, in part due to the Right to Censor storyline, and in part because of his wife's offer to pose for Playboy magazine. Until that time, Chyna had been the second major wrestling star from the World Wrestling Federation to have done a piece in Playboy (after Sable); during Chyna's debut on the adult magazine, she had suddenly broken her friendship with Carter.

In interviews, he has also stated that there may have been an alternate reason, namely, that the company wanted to fire him. He also criticized McMahon for the cavalier attitude he had given him on the day he quit. In his recollection, Ross was fired by McMahon with exactly the same demeanor while struck with a bout of Bell's palsy in 1994, a time when Ross' "usefulness" had run out. Lawler felt that Carter's release was an attempt to remove him as well, stating that the company was well-aware that he would walk out alongside his wife. Lawler's replacement with Paul Heyman launched a theory in which Heyman was promoted at Lawler's expense. Internet rumors circulated that the company was on better terms with Heyman than Lawler, and used remarks Lawler had made in criticism of ECW to launch a theory whereby Heyman wanted Lawler out. Lawler has stated repeatedly that he has no resentment towards Heyman, accusing the media and internet theorists of spreading false information.

Extreme Championship Wrestling (1997)
In 1997, Lawler became heavily involved in the working relationship between the WWF and Extreme Championship Wrestling (ECW). In interviews and commentary, he referred to the promotion as "Extremely Crappy Wrestling". His frequent insults toward ECW eventually led to the promotion "invading" Monday Night Raw in February 1997. He wrestled in two matches. The first on July 19 at Heat Wave 1997 in a steel cage match with Rob Van Dam and Sabu in a no contest against Rick Rude, The Sandman, and Tommy Dreamer. He wrestled against Dreamer at ECW's Hardcore Heaven pay-per-view in August, which Dreamer won.

Independent circuit (2001–2012)
During his absence from the WWF, Lawler made appearances on the independent circuit in both Australia and the States, as well as joining the fledgling Xcitement Wrestling Federation (XWF) promotion alongside WCW veteran Tony Schiavone as a color commentator. On October 26, 2001, he appeared on WWA The Inception as a commentator alongside Jeremy Borash, as well as wrestling in a battle royal. He also made appearances with the International Wrestling Cartel and with Maryland Championship Wrestling, where he held the promotion's world title after defeating The Bruiser on November 2. He would return to WWF after a nine-month absence.

On March 31, 2002, he reunited with his son, Brian, to defeat David Flair and Jim Cornette at the Tojo Yamamoto Memorial Show.

On November 8, 2003, in a match refereed by Mick Foley, Lawler defeated Al Snow for the JAPW Heavyweight Championship in Secaucus, New Jersey. He lost the title a month later to Dan Maff.

Also made appearances in Ohio Valley Wrestling, International Wrestling Cartel, and other promotions.

On November 11, 2005, he teamed with Brad Armstrong and Jeff Hardy to defeat The Midnight Express and Jim Cornette for CCW A Tribute for Starrcade.

On November 7, 2008, a tribute show was held for Lawler called Lawler 35 - A Tribute Fit For The King. it was held in Nashville. In the main event match, he defeated Sid Vicious.

On March 16, 2012, he defeated Tommy Dreamer at Wrestle War 2012.

Return to WWF/WWE (2001–present)

Commentator and part-time wrestler (2001–2012)

On November 19, 2001 after a nine month hiatus from the company, Lawler returned to the WWF. He was reintroduced by Vince McMahon on Raw as the replacement for color commentator (and Alliance member) Paul Heyman, who had been (kayfabe) fired in the aftermath of the Alliance's loss at the previous night's Survivor Series. As he had been before his departure, Lawler once again became color commentator on Raw and pay-per-view events alongside Jim Ross and SmackDown! with Michael Cole, until the brands were separated and Lawler became exclusive to Raw. Lawler stated that his well-worked chemistry with Jim Ross has been a result of their different styles; according to Lawler, Jim Ross is a fine storyteller and keeps fans well-versed with current storylines, whereas he provides reaction and emotion to liven the commentary.

In 2003, Raw's announce team of Lawler and Jim Ross feuded with Sunday Night Heats team of Jonathan Coachman and Al Snow. At Unforgiven, Lawler and Ross lost a match against Coachman and Snow, thus losing their right to do commentary on Raw. In a rematch, however, Ross defeated Coachman, winning Lawler and Ross their position back.

In June 2006, Extreme Championship Wrestling was re-launched and began a small invasion within WWE again. ECW and WWE went head-to-head for several weeks on Raw, which spanned to include the SmackDown! superstars. This created tension between the Raw and SmackDown! announce teams, as Tazz, an ECW alumnus, insulted and criticized Jim Ross until Lawler came to Ross' defense, reigniting their feud from 2000. The feud concluded when Tazz and Lawler faced each other in a match at ECW One Night Stand, which Tazz won in only 30 seconds by making Lawler pass out to the Tazzmission after a distraction from Joey Styles, who Lawler had slapped just prior to the match.

In July 2006, Randy Orton began a feud with Hulk Hogan. Lawler attacked Orton in defense of Hogan, which set up a match between them on Raw. Orton defeated Lawler after a low blow and an RKO.

On March 31, 2007, Lawler was inducted into the WWE Hall of Fame by William Shatner, whom Lawler had a memorable altercation with on a January 1995 episode of Raw. In August, King Booker claimed to be the only one entitled to be known as "King". After being beaten by Booker in the ring, Lawler was supposed to be forced to crown his opponent at a show of August 13 in Madison Square Garden. During the ceremony, however, Lawler announced another king as a new opponent for Booker, "The King of Kings" Triple H. This led to a worked brawl between Lawler and Booker.

On the July 7, 2008 episode of Raw, Lawler was attacked by Kane after saving Michael Cole from a similar attack, in which Kane repeatedly asked "Is he alive or is he dead?" Later that summer, he teamed with "Hacksaw" Jim Duggan to face Ted DiBiase and Cody Rhodes for the World Tag Team Championship but lost.

On the March 23, 2009 episode of Raw, Lawler challenged Chris Jericho to a match because of his disrespect and erratic behavior to WWE Hall of Famers, which Jericho accepted. The following week, Lawler lost to Jericho after submitting to the Walls of Jericho. After the match, Jericho outlined how he would remain supreme against WWE Hall of Famers at WrestleMania 25.

On the July 20 episode of Raw, Lawler announced himself as the opponent against The Brian Kendrick. He went on to defeat Kendrick. On the November 16 episode of Raw, after recent acquisition Sheamus attacked the timekeeper in frustration for not receiving an opponent, Lawler left the announce table to confront Sheamus and check on the victim, only to receive a kick to the head for his troubles. On June 7, 2010, during a Viewer's Choice edition of Raw, Lawler lost his crown to IRS because he had apparently not paid his taxes, but it was regained by Quinton Jackson later on. At the end of the night, Lawler was one of the many employees at ringside that were brutally attacked by the season 1 NXT rookies. Lawler, however, was the only person at ringside that fought back, as he used punches and chops to attack the NXT rookies assaulting him until it was a 3-on-1 assault. The following week on Raw, Lawler and the Raw roster fought off the now-called "The Nexus" when they attempted to ambush John Cena a second time. On June 28, Lawler, Ricky Steamboat, Michael Hayes, Arn Anderson, Mike Rotunda and Dean Malenko were severely attacked by the Nexus, just as they were celebrating Steamboat's career. Josh Mathews replaced Lawler on color commentator for the remainder of the show.

On the July 26 episode of Raw, Lawler teamed with Mark Henry, Goldust, Yoshi Tatsu, Evan Bourne and The Hart Dynasty in a tag team elimination match versus the Nexus. Lawler was eliminated by Heath Slater.

On the November 29 King of the Ring Raw special, Lawler (who was celebrating his 61st birthday) challenged The Miz to a WWE Championship match. It was granted by the Anonymous Raw General Manager, who made it a Tables, Ladders, and Chairs match and it was Lawler's first shot at the title. Miz retained the championship after interference by Cole and Alex Riley. Cole's interference caused tension between the two, but when Lawler threatened to attack Cole, the Anonymous Raw General Manager issued a "cease and desist" order, which barred any physicality between them.

Lawler continued to challenge with The Miz, where on the December 20 Raw, Lawler teamed with Randy Orton and John Morrison to take on Miz, Riley and Sheamus in a 6-man tag match which Lawler won by pinning Miz. This led to a rematch between Miz and Lawler the following week, with Lawler once again getting the victory, this time by count-out after Morrison got involved. Lawler teamed with Orton again on the January 10, 2011 Raw, facing The Miz and Riley, which Lawler won by pinning Riley. Lawler won a 7-man Raw Rumble match on the January 31 Raw with help from John Cena to earn a WWE Championship match against The Miz at Elimination Chamber, where he was unsuccessful in winning the title, ending the feud.

The following night on Raw, Lawler, after having enough of Cole's attitude, which included the mocking of Lawler's mother's recent death, challenged him to a match at WrestleMania XXVII, which Cole accepted on the February 28 Raw and announced that he would be trained in the coming weeks by Jack Swagger for the upcoming match. Stone Cold Steve Austin was announced as the guest referee for the match the following week. On the March 14 Raw, Lawler was confronted by his son, Brian Lawler, who was invited to Raw to "expose" his father's character. Brian ranted about various problems he had with his father before slapping him and leaving. Cole continued to harass Lawler after Brian left, but was interrupted by a returning Jim Ross. Before JR could attack Cole, Swagger attacked Lawler from behind and then proceeded to attack and lock in the ankle lock on JR, while Cole harassed him. Lawler tried to stop the attack, but fell victim to the ankle lock as well.

At WrestleMania, Lawler initially won by submission, but the Anonymous Raw General Manager reversed the decision due to Stone Cold physically getting involved in the match by pushing Cole, making Cole the winner by disqualification. Lawler and Ross then faced Cole and Swagger at Extreme Rules in a Country Whipping match, where they were defeated. Lawler challenged Cole to one last match at Over the Limit, even going as far as to putting his Hall of Fame ring on the line and offered to personally induct Cole into the Hall of Fame itself. During the contract signing, Cole announced it would be a "Kiss My Foot" match. At the pay-per-view, Lawler defeated Cole. Afterwards, Ross, Eve Torres and Bret Hart helped Lawler by making Cole kiss his foot. Following the pay-per-view, Cole apologized to Lawler, ending the feud.

Lawler competed in the 2012 Royal Rumble match as the number 12 entrant, but was eliminated by Cody Rhodes after 43 seconds. He, along with Booker T, eliminated Cole afterwards. On the April 30, 2012 episode of Raw, Lawler competed in a Beat the Clock challenge to determine the number one contender for the WWE Championship match at Over the Limit, but was defeated by Daniel Bryan, who went on to challenge for the title. On the July 9 episode of Raw, Lawler went against Cole in a WrestleMania XXVII rematch, which he quickly won, but the anonymous Raw General Manager, who returned that night as the guest general manager, reversed the decision and Lawler lost to Cole by disqualification following interference by Booker T. Santino Marella came out to reveal that Hornswoggle was the Anonymous Raw General Manager, who was hiding underneath the ring.

On the July 23 episode of WWE Raw 1000, after CM Punk attacked The Rock, Lawler would mention on commentary that "CM Punk has turned his back on the WWE Universe." The following week on Raw, Punk would confront Lawler about what he said before being interrupted by Big Show. On the August 20 episode of Raw, after Cena wouldn't tell Punk he was the "Best in the World," Punk would ask for Lawler to get in the ring and say it for the WWE Universe. After Lawler refused to say Punk was the "Best in the World" too, Punk would attack Lawler from behind. The next week on Raw, after Lawler demanded an apology from Punk, Punk would challenge Lawler to a match, which Lawler would accept later that night, where Punk would defeat Lawler in a Steel Cage match. Before the September 3 episode of Raw, Punk and Lawler brawled backstage, with Punk getting the upper hand before officials stopped them, Lawler was kicked in the throat, which caused Lawler to miss commentary that night, with The Miz filling in for him.

Heart attack incident
On September 10, 2012 during Raw at the Bell Centre in Montreal, Quebec, not long after defeating Punk and Dolph Ziggler in a tag-team match with Randy Orton, Lawler legitimately collapsed at the announcers table while Kane and Daniel Bryan competed against Titus O'Neil and Darren Young. Cole continued to call that match alone, as well as the next match, before WWE (through Cole) announced the medical situation with Lawler. The remaining matches on the show went ahead as scheduled but without commentary and updates on Lawler's condition were provided by Cole. At the end of the broadcast, it was announced that he had received CPR, but was breathing independently and reacting to stimulation. Doctors said that Lawler was clinically dead for almost 30 minutes. It was later confirmed on WWE.com that Lawler had suffered a heart attack. On September 11, 2012, he underwent an angioplasty to improve blood flow to his heart. On September 12, 2012, Lawler was reported to be slowly being eased off sedation, his ventilator removed. He was able to blink, nod, and squeeze with his hands, and that same day, the results of several CT scans showed no signs of brain damage. By September 17, Lawler had returned to his home in Memphis. During Lawler's hospital stay, it was determined that his heart attack was not caused by a blocked artery, but was instead an unexplained cardiac arrest. Lawler was soon medically cleared to continue wrestling.

It was announced on October 29 that Lawler would return to WWE on the November 12 episode of Raw. He continued his rivalry with Punk after his emotional return was interrupted by Punk and Paul Heyman, who re-enacted his heart attack. Lawler continued to favor Punk's opponents, hoping that Punk would lose the WWE Championship, which he eventually did to The Rock at the Royal Rumble much to Lawler's delight.

SmackDown (2015–2016)
On January 8, 2015, it was announced on WWE.com that Lawler would be a part of the SmackDown broadcast team as a color commentator along with Cole and Byron Saxton starting January 15, ending his 19-year run as a color commentator of Raw as he was replaced by Booker T.

On the March 30 episode of Raw, however, Lawler made a one-night return to commentary with Saxton to fill in for Cole, Booker T and JBL after they were assaulted by Brock Lesnar after Lesnar was refused his rematch against Seth Rollins. On June 17, 2016, Lawler was suspended following his arrest for domestic violence, with WWE stating they have "zero tolerance for matters involving domestic violence, and per our policy, Jerry Lawler was suspended indefinitely following his arrest", until July 1, when the charges were dropped and WWE lifted Lawler's suspension.

On July 7, 2016, Lawler returned to SmackDown resuming his commentary role. However, shortly afterwards, Lawler was taken off air and placed on the pre-show of both Raw and SmackDown as an analyst.

Sporadic appearances (2016–2019)
On December 5, 2016, it was announced that Lawler would no longer be used on pre-shows and instead be kept for special events such as the Hall of Fame ceremony.

On January 17, 2017, Lawler returned to SmackDown Live to host the return of The King's Court from his hometown of Memphis, Tennessee. During his interview with Dolph Ziggler, Ziggler took credit for Lawler's real life heart attack in September 2012 before and kicking him in the chest and leaving the ring. Later that night on Talking Smack, Renee Young announced that Lawler, Cole and Corey Graves will be the commentary team for the Royal Rumble match at the 2017 Royal Rumble. On August 28, Lawler filled in for Booker T on Raw commentary from his hometown of Memphis. Lawler, Ross and numerous other WWE Legends appeared on Raw 25 on January 22, 2018. On January 26, it was revealed that Lawler signed a new one-year deal with WWE. At the 2018 Royal Rumble, during the men's match, Lawler was the special guest commentator where he correctly predicted that Shinsuke Nakamura would win.

On March 21, 2018, Lawler suffered a stroke at his home in Memphis. He explained the incident on his podcast, which he revealed he couldn't speak for three days. He stayed in the hospital's ICU until he woke up three days later and regained his speech. The doctors said Lawler would make a full recovery. He was able to make all of his appearances during WrestleMania 34 weekend in New Orleans and was cleared to wrestle.

On April 8, 2018 at WrestleMania 34, Lawler called the fifth annual André the Giant Memorial Battle Royal on the WrestleMania 34 pre-show, alongside Ross and Saxton.

On April 27, 2018, Lawler served as part of the pre-show panel at the first WWE pay per view in Saudi Arabia called the Greatest Royal Rumble alongside Ross.

On the special SmackDown Live 1000th episode on October 16, 2018, Lawler returned as a guest commentator alongside Booker T to provide commentary for the New Day–The Bar match for the SmackDown Tag Team Championship.

Lawler returned as a guest commentator on the July 22, 2019 special episode of Raw called the Raw Reunion.

On the July 30, 2019, edition of SmackDown Live, Lawler returned to host the Kings Court with Trish Stratus as his guest.

Lawler returned on the August 19, 2019 edition of Raw to host the Kings Court and was attacked by "The Fiend" Bray Wyatt.

Return to full-time commentary (2019–2020)
On September 26, 2019, WWE announced as a part of their "WWE Premiere Week" that a new commentary team will be on Raw. Lawler would return to full-time commentary on Raw, as an analyst alongside Vic Joseph and Dio Maddin beginning on the September 30, 2019 edition of Raw. By January 2020, Lawler had outlasted both Joseph and Maddin, who were replaced by Tom Phillips and Byron Saxton, respectively. Lawler was later replaced by Samoa Joe on the April 27, 2020 edition of Raw. but has since been replaced by Corey Graves.

Memphis Wrestling (2003–2005, 2008–2009, 2014)

In 2003, Lawler made his debut for Memphis Wrestling. He defeated his rival Kamala by disqualification on May 17. He would occasionally teamed up with Bill Dundee and Brian Christopher. He had a short feud with King Mabel. On February 14, 2004, he lost to Brian Christopher in a Memphis Wrestling Television Title Vs. Jerry Lawler's Hummer match. On July 14, Brian and he won a tag team battle royal. Also, Lawler won a battle royal on Boxing Day 2004. He defeated Cassidy Reilly for the USACW United States Title on April 14, 2005.

On June 20, 2008, Lawler returned to Memphis to defeat Kevin White. He lost to Sid Vicious on February 28, 2009.

On March 14, 2014, he returned and defeated Gangrel at Carl Perkins Benefit event.

Proposed match with Hulk Hogan (2007–2008)
In 2007, it was announced that Lawler would be participating in a 'dream match' with Hulk Hogan which had been set to take place in the Memphis Wrestling promotion on April 27. The match had been heavily-hyped by promoter Corey Maclin as Hogan had competed in the Memphis territory early in his career. On April 12, however, Lawler pulled out of the event citing his contractual obligations to WWE rendering him unable to appear on a show that was due to be filmed by VH1 for the television show Hogan Knows Best. On January 11, 2008, Maclin revealed that he filed a lawsuit against WWE, claiming that pressure on Lawler (and others) to withdraw from the event violated section two of the Sherman Antitrust Act.

Jerry Lawler's Memphis Wrestling (2010)
In May 2010, Lawler announced a new TV wrestling show called, Jerry Lawler's Memphis Wrestling. The show was set to debut on Ion Network channel 50 in Memphis on June 5 at the classic 11 am timespot. Three episodes were taped May 20, 2010 at the Vine in Memphis. On September 11, 2010, Lawler announced that there would no longer be any new shows, but that the talent was still available for fundraisers.

 Northeast Wrestling (2002–present) 
Since 2002, Lawler has wrestled for Northeast Wrestling. His first match was on November 9, 2002 when he defeated Syxx-Pac.

On April 30, 2005, he defeated King Kong Bundy with special guest referee Mick Foley in Bristol, Connecticut.

From 2006 to 2007, he feuded with former WWE wrestler Romeo Roselli.

On January 15, 2011, he defeated Tommy Dreamer in a cage match. Then on October 1, 2011, he defeated Terry Funk in a No Disqualification No Holds Barred match.

In 2013, he returned to Northeast after a heart attack from 2012 where he defeated Matt Striker on September 21.

On August 25, 2017, he lost to NEW Heavyweight Champion Cody Rhodes in Pittsfield, Massachusetts.

From 2015 to 2019, he has been feuding with Brian Anthony. Lawler would team with Keith Youngblood defeating Anthony Battle and Daniel Evans on April 26, 2019 for the NEW Tag Team titles. They dropped the tiles to Brian Anthony and Daniel Evans on August 17.

On August 14, 2021, Lawler defeated Enzo Amore in a Casket match in Poughkeepsie, New York.

 Return to the independent circuit (2013–present) 
He returned to wrestling in 2013 nearly a year after his heart attack in an appearance in WWE. His first match back on May 25 in an 8 Tag team where he teamed with Dory Funk Jr. which they won at Funking Conservatory in Ocala, Florida. On July 7, 2014, he defeated Scott Steiner at Wild Fire Wrestling in Memphis. A week later, he went to World Wrestling Council in Puerto Rico where he defeated Carlito.

On October 24, 2015, Lawler defeated Terry Funk by disqualification at USA Championship Wrestling in Jackson, Tennessee at the Oman Arena. He would feud with Tommy Rich from 2017–2018. On March 23, 2019, he teamed with Rikishi defeating Scott Steiner and Buff Bagwell for the Grind City Tag Team titles at a Memphis Grizzlies game.

Lawler remains an active wrestler in Northeast Wrestling in Connecticut, USA Championship Wrestling in Tennessee, and Championship Wrestling Arkansas.

At 70, Lawler put his career on the line on January 18, 2020 against Arkansas Heavyweight Champion Matt Riviera in a "Title vs Career" match at Championship Wrestling of Arkansas' "No Surrender" event in North Little Rock, Arkansas, where he won the match and the title.

On September 26, 2020, USA Championship Wrestling celebrated his 50th anniversary of his career where he teamed with the Rock 'n' Roll Express to defeat Matt Riviera, Tommy Rich, and Doug Gilbert at the Ballpark in Jackson, Tennessee.

Lawler defeated Big Cass by disqualification at the main event of USA Championship Wrestling on May 8, 2021 in Jackson, Tennessee.

As of 2022, Lawler is feuding with Doug Gilbert.

He wrestled Scott Steiner to a draw at USA Pro 29th Anniversary Show on March 19, 2022 in Orlando, Florida.

Other endeavors
Lawler has created some musical recordings. Among these are two late-1970s singles: "Cadillac Man/Memphis", and "Bad News". During his feud with manager Jimmy Hart (Lawler is a factor for "The Mouth of the South" Jimmy Hart entering professional wrestling; Lawler wanted to record a wrestling album with him singing, and since they had gone to school together, he called Hart and asked him to be a part of it) in the mid-1980s, Hart became known as "The Wimp", a nickname given to him by Lawler and chanted by fans. Hart was the subject of the song "Wimpbusters", which was sung by Lawler to the tune of the popular hit "Ghostbusters" by Ray Parker Jr.. A music video was also made, featuring Lawler, legendary announcer Lance Russell, and wrestlers such as Randy Savage, Jimmy Valiant, Dutch Mantel, Tommy Rich, and Rufus R. Jones, along with footage of "The King" beating Hart and his "First Family." A very young Brian Christopher also made an appearance as a young child being bullied, and another child is seen wearing a replica of Tully Blanchard's West Texas State jersey. He also recorded a CD titled Memphis' Other King.

Lawler had his own talk show called "The Jerry Lawler Show" on WMC-TV in Memphis during the 1980s.

In 1998, Lawler appeared in the film Man on the Moon, starring Jim Carrey. According to Lawler's autobiography, It's Good To Be The King... Sometimes, an incident involving Jim Carrey forgetting a line led to animosity between the two actors during filming. Between scenes Jim Carrey often remained in character as Andy Kaufman and at one point spit on Jerry, just as Kaufman had done in 1982. A 'stunned' Lawler reacted by grabbing Carrey by the hair and locked him in a sleeper hold and jerking his neck— sending Carrey to the hospital.

In 1999, Lawler ran for mayor of Memphis, Tennessee. His platform focused on making the streets safer for residents, beautifying the city, and improving the quality of education. In addition, he vowed to attract businesses to Memphis, improve the flow of traffic, create more parks, and decrease property taxes. Lawler ended up with 11.7% of ballots, beating twelve of the fifteen candidates. Ultimately, however, Mayor Willie Herenton was easily reelected.

In 2000, Lawler made a very brief cameo appearance in the music video of "I Can't Lie To Me" By Clay Davidson. On December 17, 2002; he released his autobiography titled It's Good To Be The King... Sometimes. On July 8, 2009, Lawler again ran for the position of Mayor of Memphis in a special mayoral election; on October 15, 2009. He was in 5th with 4% of the vote.

Lawler is also a commercial artist, designing graphics for various companies, including WWE. In 2007, he painted the cover of the wrestling comic book Headlocked.

In 2012, he played the role of Sheriff Jackson Cole in the horror comedy film Girls Gone Dead.

Lawler has provided his voice for numerous WWE video games in which he has appeared as a commentator. He is also a playable character in a number of WWE games, WWE All Stars as a wrestler, WWE '12 as both a wrestler and a commentator and WWE '13, WWE 2K14, WWE 2K15, and WWE 2K16, WWE 2K17 and WWE 2K Battlegrounds simply as a commentator and WWE 2K20 as a wrestler.

In 2016, Lawler and business partner Barry Aycock opened a wrestling-themed establishment King Jerry Lawler's Hall of Fame Bar & Grille on Beale Street, Downtown Memphis, Tennessee. The next year Lawler opened King Jerry Lawler's Memphis BBQ Co. in Cordova, Tennessee.

In March 2017, Lawler launched the wrestling and pop-culture podcast Dinner with the King. His co-host is Glenn Moore and the podcast is produced by Pod Avenue. The podcast ceased production after Moore was accused of scamming Lawler fans who tried to buy merchandise and artwork from Lawler. Lawler and new co-host Scott Reedy started a new podcast called The Jerry Lawler Show in 2019.

Personal life

Lawler is the cousin of fellow professional wrestler The Honky Tonk Man. Lawler has been married three times and had two sons with his first wife, Kay. His son Brian, who wrestled in WWF/E under the names "Brian Christopher" and "Grandmaster Sexay," died by suicide on July 29, 2018. His other son, Kevin, has been in professional wrestling as both a referee and wrestler under the names "Kevin Christian" and "Freddie Gilbert," the latter of which was used during a stint as the "brother" of Eddie Gilbert.

In his book, It's Good To Be The King ... Sometimes, Lawler says he believes Kevin's short physical stature has prevented him from reaching success similar to Brian. In August 2008, Kevin was arrested on charges of trespassing and aggravated burglary. After divorcing Kay, Lawler was later married to Paula from February 14, 1982 to October 2, 1991.

He met his third wife, Stacy "The Kat" Carter, at a charity softball game in Memphis, Tennessee on July 23, 1989. They married in September 2000. In mid-February 2001, Carter (who was a valet and has also made in-ring appearances) was released by the World Wrestling Federation. Lawler then left the company in protest. Carter and Lawler later separated shortly before Lawler rejoined the WWF in November 2001. Their divorce was finalized on October 15, 2003.

Though he has spent most of his life in Memphis, Lawler did spend a part of his childhood in Ohio after his father was transferred to a Ford Motor Company assembly plant in Lorain, Ohio. From the ages of 7 to 15 his family resided in the city of Amherst, Ohio, a suburb near Cleveland. Although this stay was brief, it would have an influence on Lawler throughout his life thereafter. He often cites Cleveland as his second-favorite city behind only Memphis and is a die-hard fan of the Cleveland Indians, the Cleveland Browns, and the Cleveland Cavaliers. When WWE performs in Cleveland, Lawler will usually wear a Browns jersey or an Indians jersey (at SummerSlam 1996 he teased Browns fans by wearing a Baltimore Ravens jersey, because the original Browns moved to Baltimore and became the Ravens), and during baseball season, he would throw out the first pitch at an Indians game.

Lawler is a collector of Coca-Cola and Superman merchandise, and owns a replica of the Batmobile from the 1960s Batman series.

In late 1993, Lawler was indicted in Jefferson County, Kentucky on charges of statutory rape and sodomy of a 15-year-old girl. The charges were later dropped after the alleged victim recanted her story. Lawler then returned to work for the World Wrestling Federation.

Lawler's son Brian was found hanging in the Hardeman County Jail on July 29, 2018 and was pronounced dead later that day. On the one-year anniversary of his death, Lawler filed a wrongful death lawsuit against Hardeman County, Hardeman County Sheriff John Doolen and others for allegedly failing to protect him. He alleged that Doolen had personally promised to "keep an eye" on Brian after he was incarcerated.

On February 7, 2023, Lawler was rushed to hospital after suffering a stroke at his Florida home. Lawler had previously suffered a stroke in 2018.

Championships and accomplishments

 American Wrestling Association AWA Southern Heavyweight Championship (58 times)
 AWA Southern Tag Team Championship (10 times) – with Jimmy Valiant (1), Bill Dundee (3), Mongolian Stomper (1), Jos LeDuc (1), Austin Idol (1), Plowboy Frazier (1), and Big Bubba (1)
 AWA World Heavyweight Championship (1 time)
 AWA World Tag Team Championship (2 times) – with Bill DundeeCauliflower Alley ClubPresident's Award (2022)
  Championship Wrestling of Arkansas CWA Arkansas Heavyweight Championship (1 time)
 Championship Wrestling from Florida NWA Brass Knuckles Championship (Florida version) (1 time)
  Continental Wrestling Association / Championship Wrestling Association CWA World Heavyweight Championship (1 time)
 CWA International Heavyweight Championship (3 times)
 CWA Lord of the Ring (1988)
 CWA Heavyweight Championship (1 time)
 CWA World Tag Team Championship (2 times) – with Austin Idol (1) and Tommy Rich (1)
 NWA Mid-America Heavyweight Championship (3 times)
 NWA Southern Heavyweight Championship (Memphis version) (7 times)
 10,000 Dollar Tag Team Tournament- with Jimmy Valiant
 Georgia Championship Wrestling NWA Macon Tag Team Championship (2 times) – with Mr. Wrestling II (1) and Don Greene (1)
 NWA Gulf Coast Championship Wrestling NWA Tennessee Tag Team Championship (1 time) – with Jim White
 International Wrestling Association IWA Heavyweight Championship (1 time)
 Jersey All Pro Wrestling JAPW Heavyweight Championship (1 time)
 Maryland Championship Wrestling MCW Heavyweight Championship (1 time)
 MCW Tag Team Championship (1 time) – with The Bruiser
 Memphis Championship Wrestling MCW Southern Heavyweight Championship (2 times)
 Memphis Wrestling Memphis Wrestling Southern Heavyweight Championship (2 times)
 Memphis Wrestling Television Championship (1 time)Memphis Wrestling Hall of FameClass of 2017
 Northeast Wrestling NEW Tag Team Championship (1 time) - with Keith Youngblood
 NWA Mid-America NWA Southern Heavyweight Championship (Mid-America version) (10 times)
 NWA Southern Tag Team Championship (Mid-America version) (9 times) – with Jim White (7), Plowboy Frazier (1), and Bill Dundee (1)
 NWA Southern Junior Heavyweight Championship (5 times)
 NWA Tri-State Heavyweight Championship (Alabama version) (1 time)
 NWA Tri-State Tag Team Championship (Alabama version) (2 times) – with Steve Lawler
 NWA United States Tag Team Championship (Mid-America version) (1 time) – with Jackie Fargo (1)
 NWA Southern States Heavyweight Championship Tournament (1975)
 NWA Polynesian Wrestling NWA Polynesian Pacific Heavyweight Championship (1 time)
 NWA Virginia NWA All-Star Heavyweight Championship (1 time)
 Power Pro Wrestling PPW Tag Team Championship (1 time) – with Bill Dundee
 Pro Wrestling Illustrated Feud of the Year (1992) with Jeff Jarrett vs. The Moondogs
 Feud of the Year (1993) vs. Bret Hart
 Most Hated Wrestler of the Year (1993, 1995)
 Most Inspirational Wrestler of the Year (1988, 2012)
 Ranked No. 7 of the 500 top singles wrestlers in the PWI 500 in 1992
 Ranked No. 23 of the 500 top singles wrestlers in the PWI Years in 2003
 Ranked No. 56 of the 100 top tag teams of the PWI Years with Bill Dundee in 2003
 Pro Wrestling This Week Wrestler of the Week (December 6–12, 1987)
 Professional Wrestling Hall of Fame and Museum Class of 2011
 Smoky Mountain Wrestling SMW Heavyweight Championship (2 times)
 Traditional Championship Wrestling TCW Tag Team Championship (1 time) – with Matt Riviera
 United States Wrestling Association USWA Heavyweight Championship (2 times)
 USWA Texas Heavyweight Championship (1 time)
 USWA Unified World Heavyweight Championship (28 times)
 USWA World Tag Team Championship (6 times ) – with Jeff Jarrett (4) and Bill Dundee (2)
 USWA World Heavyweight Title Number One Seed Round Robin Tournament (1990)
 USWA World Heavyweight Championship Tournament (1990)
 USWA World Heavyweight Championship #1 Contender’s Tournament (1993)
 Windy City Pro Wrestling WCPW Battle Royal Championship (1 time)
 World Class Wrestling Association WCWA World Heavyweight Championship (3 time)
 WCWA Texas Heavyweight Championship (1 time)
 World Wrestling Council Caribbean Cup (2014)
 World Wrestling Federation / World Wrestling Entertainment / WWE Raw Rumble (2011)
 WWE Hall of Fame (Class of 2007)
 Slammy Award (5 times)
 Mouthiest (1994)
 I'm Talking and I Can't Shut Up (1996)
 Most Embarrassing Moment (1996) – 
 WWE.com Exclusive Video of the Year (2012) – 
 Comeback of the Year (2012)
 Wrestling Observer Newsletter Best Color Commentator (1995, 1996)
 Feud of the Year (1987) vs. Austin Idol and Tommy Rich
 Feud of the Year (1992) with Jeff Jarrett vs. The Moondogs
 Feud of the Year (1993)  vs. Bret Hart
 Worst Feud of the Year (1994)  vs. Doink the Clown
 Worst Television Announcer (2002)
 Worst Worked Match of the Year (1994) with Sleazy, Queasy and Cheesy vs. Clowns R' Us at Survivor Series
 Wrestling Observer Newsletter Hall of Fame (Class of 1996)Other titles'''''
 USACW United States Championship (1 time)

Luchas de Apuestas record

Notes

References

Further reading

External links

The Jerry Lawler Show on PodcastOne

1949 births
20th-century professional wrestlers
21st-century professional wrestlers
Andy Kaufman
American collectors
American color commentators
American male professional wrestlers
American podcasters
AWA International Heavyweight Champions
AWA World Heavyweight Champions
AWA World Tag Team Champions
Fictional kings
Living people
NWA Brass Knuckles Champions (Florida version)
NWA Macon Tag Team Champions
People from Amherst, Ohio
People from Memphis, Tennessee
Professional wrestlers from Tennessee
Professional wrestling announcers
Professional Wrestling Hall of Fame and Museum
Professional wrestling trainers
Professional wrestling podcasters
Professional wrestling promoters
SMW Heavyweight Champions
USWA World Tag Team Champions
USWA Unified World Heavyweight Champions
WWE Hall of Fame inductees
XFL (2001) announcers